The men's 200 metre backstroke event at the 2004 Olympic Games was contested at the Olympic Aquatic Centre of the Athens Olympic Sports Complex in Athens, Greece on August 18 and 19. There were 36 competitors from 30 nations. Each nation had been limited to two swimmers in the event since 1984.

U.S. swimmer Aaron Peirsol won a gold medal in this event, with an Olympic record time of 1:54.95. Markus Rogan, silver medalist in the 100 metre backstroke, added another silver for Austria in the same stroke, in an outstanding time of 1:57.35. Romania's Răzvan Florea, who finished behind Rogan by 0.21 of a second, earned a bronze in 1:57.56. Peirsol became the fifth swimmer and fourth American in Olympic history to claim titles in two backstroke events. He was also only the third swimmer to win multiple medals in the men's 200 backstroke (Roland Matthes and Mitch Ivey both did so in 1968 and 1972). It was the third consecutive, and sixth overall, victory for the United States in the event. It was Austria's first medal in the men's 200 metre backstroke since 1900; Romania had never won a medal in the event before.

In the final, Peirsol won the race but was disqualified for a noncontinuous backstroke turn (in backstroke, a swimmer is allowed to rotate onto his/her stomach going into a turn, as long as 1) only one arm pull occurs while the swimmer is on his/her stomach and 2) the turn is one smooth motion ). The judge in Peirsol's lane indicated that Peirsol had kicked in to the wall on the third turn. Peirsol's disqualification was appealed, and overturned, reinstating his time and finish. An initial statement from FINA was that the explanation given on the judge's report was "inadequate and not in the working language of FINA." The judge was from France, and the official languages of FINA are French and English. A later statement by FINA executive director Cornel Mărculescu revealed that the judge's report, which had also been signed off on by two other officials including referee Woon Sui Kut, was blank. All three officials were removed from further involvement with the 2004 Olympic swimming competitions. The British team have announced their intention to appeal to a higher body in an attempt to get their fourth-place swimmer James Goddard for a bronze medal.

Background

This was the 12th appearance of the 200 metre backstroke event. It was first held in 1900. The event did not return until 1964; since then, it has been on the programme at every Summer Games. From 1904 to 1960, a men's 100 metre backstroke was held instead. In 1964, only the 200 metres was held. Beginning in 1968 and ever since, both the 100 and 200 metre versions have been held.

Six of the 8 finalists from the 2000 Games returned: silver medalist Aaron Peirsol of the United States, bronze medalist Matt Welsh of Australia, fifth-place finisher (and 1996 bronze medalist) Emanuele Merisi of Italy, sixth-place finisher Răzvan Florea of Romania, seventh-place finisher Rogério Romero of Brazil, and eighth-place finisher Gordan Kožulj of Croatia. Peirsol had won the 2001 and 2003 World Championships, broken the world record in 2002 and again at the 2004 U.S. Olympic trials, and won the 100 metre backstroke earlier in Athens; he was heavily favoured.

Finland made its debut in the event. Australia and Great Britain each made their 11th appearance, tied for most among nations to that point.

Competition format

The competition followed the format established in 2000, with three rounds: heats, semifinals, and a final. The advancement rule followed the format introduced in 1952. A swimmer's place in the heat was not used to determine advancement; instead, the fastest times from across all heats in a round were used. The top 16 swimmers from the heats advanced to the semifinals. The top 8 semifinalists advanced to the final. Swim-offs were used as necessary to break ties.

This swimming event used backstroke. Because an Olympic-size swimming pool is 50 metres long, this race consisted of four lengths of the pool.

Records

Prior to this competition, the existing world and Olympic records were as follows:

The following records were established during the competition:

Schedule

All times are Greece Standard Time (UTC+2)

Results

Heats

Semifinals

Final

References

External links
Official Olympic Report

M
200 metre backstroke at the Olympics
Men's events at the 2004 Summer Olympics